Iljumun is the first gate at the entrance to many Korean Buddhist temples. Called the "One-Pillar Gate", because when viewed from the side the gate appears to be supported by a single pillar.

Description 
The Iljumun is one of the three major types of gates constructed on the path that leads to the temple and often illustrates the formality of Buddhist architecture. The other two are the Cheonwangmun (Gate of Guardians) and the Haetalmun (Gate of Deliverance). The construction of Iljumun is said to have originated from the tradition of placing four gates at the four cardinal points around the stupas of Sanchi in India since the 1st century BC.

The Iljumun symbolizes the one true path of enlightenment which supports the world. Physically, the gate serves to demarcate the temple from the outside. It is the boundary between the Buddhist temple and a human's worldly life. The gate symbolizes purification and one must leave all of their worldly desires before entering the temple.

The oneness is also a metaphor for non-duality (unity) in spirit and heart.

An image of an Iljumun appears on the obverse of the Korean Service Medal.

See also
 Hongsalmun, in Korean architecture with both religious and other usage 
 Torana, in Hindu-Buddhist Indian-origin also found in Southeast Asia and East Asia
 Toran, ceremonial Indian door decoration
 Torii, in Japanese temple architecture
 Paifang, in Chinese temple architecture
 Hongsalmun, in Korean temple architecture
 Tam quan, in Vietnamese temple architecture

References

Architecture in Korea